George Poole may refer to:

George Amos Poole (1843–1918), American printer
George Amos Poole, II (1874-1946), American printer
George Amos Poole, III (1907-1990), American printer
 George Ayliffe Poole (1809–1883), English clergyman and author

See also 
 George Temple-Poole (1856–1934), British architect and public servant